Northridge High School is a secondary school in Middlebury, Indiana, serving grades 9-12 for the Middlebury Community Schools.

Statistics
In the 2020-21 school year, total enrollment is at 1,412 students.

In the 2020-21 school year the ethnicity breakdown is:
White - 83.9%
Hispanic - 11.1%
Asian - 1.3%
Black - 0.8%
American-Indian - 0.2%
Multi-racial - 2.5%

Athletics
Northridge High School is part of the Indiana High School Athletic Association, which is a voluntary, non-profit organization available for any school in the state of Indiana accredited by the Indiana Department of Education. Northridge competes in boys basketball, football, baseball, wrestling, cross-country, track, swimming, tennis, golf, and soccer. Women can participate in basketball, volleyball, swimming, cross-country, track, soccer, tennis, softball, cheerleading, and golf.

1988 IHSAA State Champions: Softball
2004 IHSAA State Champions: Boys Cross Country

Notable alumni

Eric Carpenter, soccer player
Jordon Hodges, actor
Joanna King, member of the Indiana House of Representatives

See also
 List of high schools in Indiana

References

External links
 http://www.mcsin-k12.org
Public high schools in Indiana
Schools in Elkhart County, Indiana
Educational institutions established in 1969
1969 establishments in Indiana